This is a list of properties and districts in Stephens County, Georgia that are listed on the National Register of Historic Places (NRHP).

Current listings

|}

References

Stephens
Buildings and structures in Stephens County, Georgia